There are many Friends of Israel groups active around the world and in a variety of fields, such as academic, legal, political, etc. Those with articles on Wikipedia include:

 Friends of Israel Initiative, an international effort to counter the attempts to delegitimize the State of Israel and its right to live in peace within safe and defensible borders
 Parliamentary groups in the United Kingdom that promote close ties between Britain and Israel:
 Labour Friends of Israel
 Conservative Friends of Israel
 Liberal Democrat Friends of Israel
 Friends of Israel in the Parliament of Norway
 Northern Ireland Friends of Israel
 European Friends of Israel
 Anglican Friends of Israel
 Friends of the Israel Defense Forces
 Clerical Association of Friends of Israël or Opus sacerdotale Amici Israel, an association of Catholic priests (1926 – 1928)